Mimasaka can refer to:
 Mimasaka, Okayama, city in Japan
 Mimasaka Province, former province of Japan